Los Cortijillos is a village and district of the Spanish municipality of Los Barrios of the Province of Cádiz, Andalucia, Spain. It is located six kilometres east of the main town of the municipality, just south of Guadacorte, between Gibraltar and Algeciras. As of 2009 had a population of 2,636 inhabitants. There is an industrial park and marshes in the area.

References

Populated places in the Province of Cádiz
Los Barrios